United Nations Security Council resolution 564, adopted unanimously on 31 May 1985, after noting the statement made by the President of the Security Council, the council expressed alarm and concern at the violence involving the civilian population in Lebanon, including at Palestinian refugee camps resulting in casualties.

The Council urged international organisations, such as the International Committee of the Red Cross and United Nations Relief and Works Agency for Palestine Refugees in the Near East to assist in providing humanitarian assistance to the civilian population. It also called on the Government of Lebanon and Secretary-General to ensure the implementation of Resolution 564, of which the council would closely follow.

See also
 Israeli–Lebanese conflict
 Lebanese Civil War
 List of United Nations Security Council Resolutions 501 to 600 (1982–1987)
 South Lebanon conflict (1982–2000)

References
Text of the Resolution at undocs.org

External links
 

 0564
Israeli–Lebanese conflict
 0564
1985 in Israel
1985 in Lebanon
 0564
May 1985 events